A Beautiful Wife is a 2007 Italian comedy film directed by Leonardo Pieraccioni.

Cast
Leonardo Pieraccioni as Mariano
Laura Torrisi as Miranda
Gabriel Garko as Andrea
Massimo Ceccherini as Baccano
Rocco Papaleo as Pomodoro
Francesco Guccini as the musical's director
Tony Sperandeo as Don Pierino
Alessandro Paci as Acciarito
Chiara Francini as Giustina
Giorgio Ariani as the politician

References

External links

2007 films
Films directed by Leonardo Pieraccioni
2000s Italian-language films
2007 romantic comedy films
Italian romantic comedy films
2000s Italian films